Kelvin Taylor (born September 28, 1993) is an American football running back. He played college football at Florida.

Early years
Taylor attended Glades Day School in Belle Glade, Florida. As a junior, he broke Emmitt Smith's Florida career rushing yards record. For his career, he had 12,121 yards and 191 touchdowns. Taylor was rated by ESPN.com as a five-star recruit and ranked as the nation’s No. 1 running back in his class. He committed to the University of Florida to play college football.

College career
As a true freshman at Florida in 2013, Taylor played in 10 games and made four starts. For the season he had 508 yards on 111 carries with four touchdowns. As a sophomore in 2014, he played in all 12 games with two starts. He carried the ball 116 times for 565 yards and six touchdowns. In the final game of his junior year, he became just the ninth player to rush for over 1,000 yards (1,035) in UF history. His 259 rushes were the second-most in a single season in school history and his 13 rushing touchdowns equaled the third-most by a running back in school history. Following his record-setting 2015 campaign, Taylor announced his intentions to enter the 2016 NFL Draft.

Professional career

San Francisco 49ers
Taylor was selected in the sixth round, 211th overall, in the 2016 NFL Draft by the 49ers. On September 3, 2016, he was released by the 49ers as part of final roster cuts and was signed to the practice squad the next day. He was released by the 49ers on November 28, 2016.

Seattle Seahawks
On November 30, 2016, Taylor was signed to the Seahawks' practice squad. He was released on December 8, 2016. On December 13, 2016, he was signed to the Seahawks' active roster. He was released on December 20, 2016 and re-signed to the practice squad. He signed a reserve/future contract with the Seahawks on January 16, 2017.

On May 4, 2017, Taylor was waived by the Seahawks.

Kansas City Chiefs
Taylor was claimed off waivers by the Chiefs on May 5, 2017. He was waived by the Chiefs on May 9, 2017.

Atlanta Falcons
On August 8, 2017, Taylor signed with the Atlanta Falcons. He was waived on September 1, 2017.

Cleveland Browns
On January 10, 2018, Taylor signed a reserve/future contract with the Cleveland Browns. He was waived by the Browns on April 12, 2018.

Orlando Apollos
In 2018, Kelvin Taylor signed with the Orlando Apollos, an Alliance of American Football team coached by Steve Spurrier.

Orlando Guardians
On November 17, 2022, Taylor was drafted by the Orlando Guardians of the XFL. He signed with the team on February 15, 2023. He rushed for 84 yards in three games before he was released on March 8.

Personal life
Taylor is the son of former Jacksonville Jaguars running back, Fred Taylor, also out of Florida.

References

External links
Florida Gators bio
NFL Scouting Combine profile

1993 births
Living people
American football running backs
Atlanta Falcons players
Cleveland Browns players
Florida Gators football players
Kansas City Chiefs players
Orlando Apollos players
Orlando Guardians players
People from Belle Glade, Florida
Players of American football from Florida
San Francisco 49ers players
Seattle Seahawks players
Sportspeople from the Miami metropolitan area